Yuquan is a town in Yunyang County, Chongqing, China. , it administers Yuquan Residential Community and the following 12 villages:
Macao Village
Yanzi Village
Longwan Village
Baiguo Village
Hualou Village
Jianping Village
Luming Village
Wanglu Village
Cigu Village
Bayi Village
Mugua Village
Sanxing Village

References

Township-level divisions of Chongqing
Yunyang County